N-Ethyl-N-(2-chloroethyl)aniline is the organic compound with the formula C6H5N(Et)(CH2CH2Cl) (Et = ethyl).  It is a low-melting colorless solid that is an alkylating agent.  The compound is a precursor to several cationic azo dyes via reaction of the chloroethyl group with tertiary amines or pyridine followed by azo coupling.  Examples of derived dyes include C. I. Basic Red 18, Maxilon Red 2GL, and Yoracryl Red 2G.

References

Anilines